Following are songs recorded by Florence and the Machine:

References

Florence and the Machine